"Rokkugo" is the first single by Super Junior-T, released on February 23, 2007. Over 45,997 copies were sold by the end of the year, marking it Korea's sixteenth best-selling record and best-selling single of 2007. "Rokkugo" has been one of Super Junior's most well-known songs.

Super Junior-T re-released this single in Japan on November 5, 2008, collaborating with the Japanese female comedy duo, Moeyan.

Overview
Rokkugo, is "gokkuro" spelled backwards, a term meaning "backwards" or "opposite". The single is promoted as a trot single, although influences can be heard in each track, such as rap and stylized modern music rhythms, included K-pop. The music video features fellow label mate Isak as a comedic rabbit who was playing Whack A Mole with the members as the targets. Although trot music are usually more accepted by the older audience because of its older style of korean popular music, Super Junior-T's "Rokkugo" has been well-accepted by young audiences as each track in the single are bending more towards a new style of trot to attract the attention of the young audience, hoping to make traditional trot music more accepting in mainstream music.

Three more EPs were released after the single was released in Taiwan. A music video and making video of "Rokkugo" is included in the package.

Track listing

Credits 
Credits adapted from album's liner notes. The instrumental version of the songs will not be added due to the same credits.

Studio 
 SM Concert Hall Studio – recording, mixing, digital editing 
 SM Yellow Tail Studio – recording 
 ARCHE Studio – recording 
 Sonic Korea – mastering

Personnel 

 SM Entertainment – executive producer
 Lee Soo-man – producer
 Kim Young-min – executive supervisor
 Super Junior-T – vocals, background vocals 
 Eunhyuk – lyrics 
 Heechul – lyrics 
 Bang Sil-i – featuring vocals, chorus 
 Yoon Myung-sun – lyrics, composition 
 Yeom Chul-muk – arrangement 
 Shin Sang-ho – lyrics, composition 
 Kim Jeong-bae – arrangement 
 Chu Ga-yeoul – lyrics, composition 
 Ahn Ik-soo – arrangement , vocal directing 
 Yoon Jong-shin – vocal directing 
 Yang Hyun-suk – vocal directing 
 Lee Jae-myung – guitar 
 Go Myung-jae – guitar 
 Sam Lee – guitar 
 Nam Koong-jin – recording, mixing, digital editing 
 Lee Seong-ho – recording 
 Oh Se-hyung – recording 
 Jeon Hoon – mastering

Japanese release

"Rock & Go", also known as "65" (in Japanese language represents Japanese terms for numbers six (roku) and five (go)), is Super Junior-T's second single and first Japanese CD single. The single features Japanese comedic duo Moeyan. "Rock & Go" also marks Moeyan's first musical debut.

"Rock & Go" is the Japanese version of "Rokkugo", and was released in Japan on November 5, 2008. The single debuted at #19 on the Oricon Daily Charts and jumped to #2 three days later.

The single peaked at number fourteen in the Oricon Weekly Albums Chart and charted for two weeks.

Track list

CD
 Rokkugo!
 Ashita no Tameni (For Tomorrow) / Sungmin (SUPER JUNIOR-T) X Moeyan
 Rokkugo! (Instrumental)
 Ashita no Tameni (For Tomorrow) (Instrumental)
 Ashita no Tameni (For Tomorrow) (Instrumental with Sungmin)

CD + DVD
 Rokkugo! (video clip)
 SUPER JUNIOR-T x Moeyan Trip (promotional clips)

References

External links
 SM Entertainment's Official Site
 Super Junior's Official Site
  Super Junior-T Official Site

2007 singles
Super Junior songs
SM Entertainment singles
Trot songs